Dastak-e Olya (also Romanized as Dastak-e ‘Olyā; also known as Dastak) is a village in Howmeh-ye Sarpol Rural District, in the Central District of Sarpol-e Zahab County, Kermanshah Province, Iran. At the 2006 census, its population was 88, in 22 families.

References 

Populated places in Sarpol-e Zahab County